Halie Loren (born Oct 23, 1984) is an American jazz singer and songwriter from Sitka, Alaska.  Her albums have reached number one on the Billboard Japan Top 20 Jazz Albums chart.

Career

Albums 
Halie Loren's recordings are distributed by JVC Kenwood Victor Entertainment, Justin Time Records, and Burnside Distribution Corporation.

They Oughta Write a Song 

In 2008, They Oughta Write a Song debuted at number three in Billboard Japan jazz album sales and appeared on the chart for 33 weeks.[8] Critical reception was positive.[9] [10] "With her bell-clear voice, careful but natural diction and a subtle sexiness in her delivery, she offers a new — and perhaps less drug-hazed — take on Procol Harum's "A Whiter Shade of Pale," reviewer Serena Markstrom wrote in The Register-Guard.[11]

A YouTube video for the album single Perhaps, Perhaps, Perhaps was viewed 5.6 million times as of October 2017.

Many Times, Many Ways 

Many Times, Many Ways: A Holiday Collection was released in 2008. The duo album featured two original compositions by pianist/co-producer Matt Treder.

Stages 

Stages, Loren's first live CD, was recorded at two concerts on the Oregon Coast and released in March 2010. CD Baby selected it as an Editor's Pick in October 2010, writing that "Her respect for the past is undeniable, while her finger on the pulse of modern music gives her songs a wide appeal that reaches far beyond jazz clubs."[12] Wildy's World named it  the best live album of the year.[13]

After Dark 

In 2010, Loren released After Dark. Wildy's World called it one of 2010’s top three indie albums and named her Artist of the Year. [19] [20] [21]

Loren’s original song "Thirsty" was nominated for best jazz song for the 2011 Independent Music Awards[26] and won for best jazz song in the IMA Vox Pop poll.[27] Loren's original song "In Time" was released as a single to benefit the Japanese Red Cross in the wake of the earthquake and tsunami of 2011.[40]

Heart First 

Loren's fifth jazz album, Heart First, was released in Japan December 14, 2011, and in North America on March 6, 2012.[29]

Jazz Critique magazine chose Heart First as the best vocal jazz album of 2011.☂ In Canada it peaked at number one in jazz album sales on iTunes[33] and number two on Amazon.

On December 11, 2011, the album's prerelease single, Fly Me to the Moon, was the number-one jazz track on iTunes Japan.[35]

On December 14, 2011, twelve of Loren tracks concurrently appeared on iTunes Japan's top 100 chart.[36] The album's eponymous song Heart First was number one in jazz singles on iTunes Canada on March 24, 2012.

JazzTimes reviewer Christopher Loudon praised her "chameleonic vocal skills" and reported that the album "generated plenty of buzz about her emergence as the next big thing among jazz vocalists."[37]

Dan Bilawsky on All About Jazz wrote, "Loren’s ability to find something new in the old makes this a fun ride. … Depending on the song, Loren can be sweet, sly, or sultry, but she always finds the right read."[38] Brian Arsenault in The International Review of Music wrote, "Alternately sexy and smooth, sultry and wry, Ms. Loren uses her not inconsiderable gifts well."[39]

Simply Love 

Her sixth jazz album, Simply Love, was released in 2013. It entered Billboard Japan's Top Jazz Albums chart at number two in its first week of release.[34]

Positive response came from USA TODAY, with reviewer Elysa Garnder writing, "The twenty-something chanteuse brings a playful precocity and an easy sexiness to the standards on Simply Love."

The Seattle Weekly found that "To hear Halie Loren sing is to glimpse the divine, and it is easy to see why this jazz vocalist is getting noticed here and abroad."

"For sheer vocal beauty and old-school warmth, few among her contemporaries can match Halie Loren," Christopher Loudon wrote in Jazz Times.

Butterfly Blue 

Butterfly Blue, released in 2015, was Loren's seventh jazz release and second number-one Billboard Japan jazz album. In a 4 1/2 (out of 5) star review, All About Jazz reviewer C. Michael Bailey noted that "Loren brings that voice, her compositional and arranging skills, and a damn good band," and praised her daring choice of standards.

NPR reviewer George D. Graham cited it as one of the best albums of 2015. From his review: "If you are looking for an appealing jazz-influenced female singer-songwriter, there are a lot of outstanding chanteuses from which to choose on the music scene these days. Halie Loren’s new album underscores her place in the ranks among the best of them, and the variety on her new album provides extra appeal."

The Best Collection 

The Best Collection, a selection of hits from her catalog and a new song recorded for the album, was released in Asia in 2014.

Live at Cotton Club 

Live at Cotton Club was released in Japan in 2016.

Selected performances 
In 2012, she performed with the Corvallis/OSU Symphony Orchestra and Orchestra Siciliana.

In 2013 she performed a holiday concert in Louisiana with the Monroe Symphony Orchestra.

In 2016, she performed with Oliver Jones at Victoria International JazzFest. She headlined the Britt Orchestra summer pops concert helmed by music director and conductor Teddy Abrams at the Oregon Britt Festival.

In 2017, Loren toured internationally at the Suwon Jazz Festival in Korea, Orchestra Siciliana in Italy, the Port-au-Prince International Jazz Festival, and an eight-show engagement at Cotton Club Tokyo. She also performed at Jazz Aspen Snowmass.

Loren is a member of musical group The Sugar Beets and records and performs with her band halie and the moon, which has released two EPs. Loren independently released Full Circle in 2006, a collection of her original songs performed by her on vocals and keyboards and featuring co-producer James M. House on guitar and bass.

Biography 
Loren grew up in Sitka, Alaska, making her performing debut at age ten at the Sitka Fine Arts Camp. She received a degree in visual arts from the University of Oregon. She lives in Eugene, Oregon.

Awards and honors
 First Place, Country category, Pacific Songwriting Competition, "What We're Fighting For" written by Halie Loren and Larry Wayne Clark (2005)
 Jazz Song of the Year, "Thirsty", Independent Music Awards, Vox Pop poll (2011)
 Best Vocal Jazz Album, Heart First, Jazz Critique magazine (Japan) (2011)
 Her debut album, They Oughta Write a Song, won best vocal jazz album at the 2009 Just Plain Folks awards. and in 2010 became Japan's second highest-selling jazz album.[2]

Discography

References

External links 
 Official site

Living people
Singer-songwriters from Oregon
Musicians from Portland, Oregon
Musicians from Eugene, Oregon
Jazz-pop singers
Smooth jazz singers
American women jazz singers
American jazz singers
1984 births
Ballad musicians
21st-century American singers
21st-century American women singers
Justin Time Records artists
People from Sitka, Alaska
Singer-songwriters from Alaska